Sport climbing at the 2018 Asian Games was held at the JSC Sport Climbing Arena, Palembang, Indonesia, from 23 to 27 August 2018.

Schedule

Medalists

Men

Women

Medal table

Participating nations
A total of 121 athletes from 16 nations competed in sport climbing at the 2018 Asian Games:

References

External links
Sport climbing at the 2018 Asian Games
Official Result Book – Sport Climbing

 
2018
2018 Asian Games events
Asian Games